North Aulatsivik Island is a Canadian island located in northern Labrador, in Newfoundland and Labrador. It is located within Torngat Mountains National Park.

See also
South Aulatsivik Island

References

Islands of Newfoundland and Labrador